Statistics of Danish War Tournament in the 1941/1942 season.

Series 1

Series 2

Series 3

Quarterfinals
Aalborg Boldspilklub 0–1 Akademisk Boldklub
Kjøbenhavns Boldklub 2–1 KFUM
Boldklubben 1909 2–2 Boldklubben Frem
Boldklubben 1909 was awarded winner by lot.
Boldklubben af 1893 5–0 Østerbros Boldklub

Semifinals
Akademisk Boldklub 2–1 Kjøbenhavns Boldklub
Boldklubben 1909 0–5 Boldklubben af 1893

Final
Boldklubben af 1893 3–2 Akademisk Boldklub

References
Denmark – List of final tables (RSSSF)

Top level Danish football league seasons
Den
Football